{{DISPLAYTITLE:C23H27NO9}}
The molecular formula C23H27NO9 (molar mass: 461.46 g/mol) may refer to:

 Morphine-3-glucuronide
 morphine-6-glucuronide

Molecular formulas